Joanna Lawn (born 1973) is an ironman triathlete from New Zealand. She began in cycling before becoming a triathlete. She went on to win the Ironman New Zealand competition every year from 2003 to 2008 and again in 2010.

She competed at the 2009 Ironman World Championship

References

External links 
Joanna Lawn's home page

1973 births
Living people
New Zealand female triathletes
20th-century New Zealand women
21st-century New Zealand women